Richard Anthony Cunningham (born August 18, 1970) is a former American football placekicker in the National Football League for the Dallas Cowboys, Carolina Panthers, and Jacksonville Jaguars. He played college football at the University of Louisiana-Lafayette.

Early years
Cunningham attended Terrebonne High School, where he competed in football, baseball, tennis and track. As a senior, he contributed to the school winning the 1998 baseball district title.

He accepted a football scholarship from the University of Louisiana at Lafayette. He was the team's kickoff specialist in his first 2 seasons. 

As a junior, he became the team's starter at placekicker, making 5-of-11 field goals. He hit a 50 and a 46-yarder in a 13-12 win against Northern Illinois University.

As a senior, he made 8-of-10 field goals attempts and 15-of-15 extra points attempts. He had a 49-yard field goal in a 17-14 win against Western Kentucky. He made a career-high 3 field goals against the University of Tulsa.

He finished his college career after making 13-of-21 field goal attempts and 31-of-32 extra points, for a total of 70 points.

Professional career

Dallas Cowboys (first stint)
Cunningham sat out the 1993 season. He was signed as an undrafted free agent by the Dallas Cowboys after the 1994 NFL Draft. On August 17, he was released after being beaten out by Chris Boniol.

Green Bay Packers
In April 1996, he signed with the Green Bay Packers in 1996. Although he had an excellent preseason, including a game-winning field goal against the Baltimore Ravens, the team released him on August 19 and decided to keep veteran Chris Jacke.

Dallas Cowboys (second stint)
On April 15, 1997, he was signed by the Dallas Cowboys to compete for the starting job, after Chris Boniol left in free agency. He began his NFL career by making a 53-yard field goal in the season opener against the Pittsburgh Steelers (fourth longest debut field goal in league history). He made 5-of-5 field goals in the third game against the Philadelphia Eagles, to total 15 of the Cowboys' 21 points. He had 19 field goals in his first 6 career games, breaking Jan Stenerud's league record of 18. He set a franchise record of 12 consecutive games with a made field goal. He had a streak of 18 consecutive field goals made (third longest in franchise history).

He was named to the All-Pro team at the end of the season. He was 34-of-37 on his field goal attempts (91.9%), leading the NFL in field goals made, setting the club record and ranking second for a rookie in league history. He was second in the NFL in field goal percentage and points scored (franchise record). He was 24 for 24 on extra points.

In 1998, he tied a franchise record with a 54-yard field goal and made 29-of-35 field goal attempts, which at the time ranked third in club history. 

In 1999, he was limited with a sprained right ankle and was released 12 games into the season, after he slumped and made only 12-of-22 of his field goal attempts. He was replaced with Eddie Murray.

Carolina Panthers 
On December 14, 1999, he signed as a free agent with the Carolina Panthers, to replace an injured John Kasay. On December 18, he tied a franchise single-game record by making 5 extra points against the San Francisco 49ers. He appeared in the final three games of the season, making 3-of-3 field goals and 13-of-14 extra points.

In 2000, he played in the first 4 games of the season, making 5-of-7 field goal attempts and 9-of-9 extra points. He had a 25-yard attempt blocked in one contest and missed a 27-yard attempt against the Washington Redskins in a 7-20 loss. He was replaced with Joe Nedney.

Cincinnati Bengals
On March 16, 2001, he signed a two-year contract with the Cincinnati Bengals, to compete in training camp with Neil Rackers. He was released on August 27.

Jacksonville Jaguars
On November 27, 2002, he was signed as a free agent by the Jacksonville Jaguars, to replace a struggling Tim Seder. On December 3, he was cut after playing in one game, making a 23-yard field goal and 2 extra points. His release was done to sign placekicker Danny Boyd, who the club thought had a bigger potential.

He finished his professional career with 84 for 105 field goal attempts. His 80 percent rate was tied for 27th All-time in a career.

Personal life
Cunningham also received some notoriety during his NFL career for sharing the same name of the Happy Days television character played by Ron Howard.

He currently works for a pharmaceutical company. He is divorced from Kristin Cunningham and has three kids.

References

External links
Cunningham reflects on life as NFL kicker

1970 births
Living people
Terrebonne High School alumni
Sportspeople from Houma, Louisiana
Players of American football from Louisiana
American football placekickers
Louisiana Ragin' Cajuns football players
Dallas Cowboys players
Carolina Panthers players
Jacksonville Jaguars players